The Gbele Resource Centre or Gbele Game Production Reserve is one of the lesser known game reserves in Ghana. It is located in the Sissala West, Sissala East Municipal and Daffiama Bussie Issa districts of the Upper West Region The reserve is the fourth largest in Ghana. The nearest town is Tumu, capital of the Sissala East Municipal District which is 17 kilometres to the north. A total of 176 species of birds have been recorded in the reserve. The staff in the reserve are aware of an additional 18 species. The reserve contains antelope, hartebeest, bushbuck, waterbuck, savannah duikers and warthogs, baboon, patas, green monkey among others. There are about 190 species of birds as well. There are nature hikes provided as well. About 30 kilometres to the north of the centre is the Gwollu Defence Wall.

Location
The Gbele Resource Centre is located to the northeast of Wa, capital of the Upper West Region. To the west is Nadowli, Jirapa and Lawra. To the north is Nandom and Hamile . There is a village called Gbele located within the reserve.

Resettlement
In 2019, the government finalised an agreement with settlers in the park which will ensure that they had all vacated the reserve by March 2020 and moved to new housing units it had built for them. The resettlement programme began in 2011. The settlers had migrated into the reserve in search of fertile land for farming.

Habitat
The topgraphy of the reserve is generally flat. The Kulpawn River which is seasonal flows from the west to the southeast. Around the Gbele village are thickets clumps consisting of the African baobab, acacia and sycamore fig trees.

Flora

 African baobab (Adansonia digitata)
 Faidherbia (Acacia albida)
 Sycamore fig (Ficus sycomorus)

Fauna
Gbele Resource Centre is the only wildlife reserve where the Rufous-rumped lark is known to occur and breed. It is also one of only three reserves where the Yellow-billed oxpecker is recorded.

Birds:

 Black-headed weaver ( Ploceus melanocephalus)
 Dorst's cisticola ( Cisticola guinea)
 Gambaga flycatcher (Muscicapa gambagae)
 Northern carmine bee-eater (Merops nubicus)
 Red-throated bee-eater (Merops bulocki)
 Rufous-rumped lark (Pinarocorys erythropygia)
 Spotted thick-knee (Burhinus capensis)
 Violet turaco (Musophaga violacea)
Willcocks's honeyguide (Indicator willcocksi)
 Yellow-billed oxpecker (Buphagus africanus)

Animals:

Buffalo
Bushbuck  (Tragelaphus scriptus)
Elephant
Roan antelope (Hippotragus equinus)

Gallery

See also
Tamale Airport
Wa Airport
Gwollu Defence Wall

References

External links

National parks of Ghana
Protected areas of Ghana
Upper West Region